Gucha may refer to:

Gucha River, a river in Kenya
Gucha District, in western Kenya
English transcription for Guča, a town in western Serbia, with its yearly
Guča trumpet festival